The 2016 Tour de France was the 103rd edition of the Tour de France, one of cycling's Grand Tours. The -long race consisted of 21 stages, starting on 2 July in Mont Saint-Michel, Normandy, and concluding on 24 July with the Champs-Élysées stage in Paris. A total of 198 riders from 22 teams entered the race.

Mark Cavendish of  won the opening stage to take the general classification leader's yellow jersey.  rider Peter Sagan won the second stage to claim yellow and held onto it until the fifth stage when Greg Van Avermaet took the stage and the yellow jersey. Van Avermaet lost ground in the mountainous eighth stage, finishing over 25 minutes behind the stage winner Froome, who took the yellow jersey. Froome retained the yellow jersey through to stage 17 and extended his lead further following a strong performance in the stage 18's mountain time trial. Bardet won the mountainous 19th stage and moved into second place overall and despite crashing in the rain, Froome was able to extend his lead. He then held the lead into the finish in Paris.

The points classification was won by Sagan, who won three stages. 's Rafał Majka won the mountains classification.  rider Adam Yates, in fourth place overall, won the young rider classification. Cavendish won the most stages, with four.

Teams

Twenty-two teams participated in the 2016 edition of the Tour de France. The race was the 18th of the 28 events in the UCI World Tour, and all of its eighteen UCI WorldTeams were automatically invited, and obliged, to attend the race. The presentation of the teams – where the members of each team's roster are introduced in front of the media and local dignitaries – took place in the town square of Sainte-Mère-Église, Normandy, on 28 June, two days before the opening stage held in the region. Each team arrived in World War II military vehicles, commemorating the Normandy landings.

Each squad was allowed a maximum of nine riders, therefore the start list contained a total of 198 riders. Of these, 33 were competing in their first Tour de France. The riders came from 35 countries; France, Spain, the Netherlands, Belgium, Italy and Germany all had 10 or more riders in the race. Riders from ten countries won stages during the race; British riders won the largest number of stages, with seven. The average age of riders in the race was 30 years, ranging from the 22-year-old Sondre Holst Enger to the 42-year-old Matteo Tosatto. Of the total average ages,  was the youngest team and  the oldest.

The teams entering the race were:

UCI WorldTeams

 
 
 
 
 
 
 
 
 
 
 
 
 
 
 
 
 
 

UCI Professional Continental teams

Pre-race favourites

In the run up to the 2016 Tour de France, Chris Froome was seen by many as the top pre-race favourite for the general classification. His closest rivals were thought to be Nairo Quintana and Alberto Contador. The other riders considered contenders for the general classification were Richie Porte, Thibaut Pinot, Fabio Aru, Vincenzo Nibali, who won the 2014 Tour and the 2016 Giro d'Italia, Romain Bardet, and Tejay van Garderen.

Froome, who won both the 2013 and 2015 editions of the race, had shown his form during the season with overall victories in two stage races, the Herald Sun Tour and the Critérium du Dauphiné, a race considered to be the warm-up for the Tour. The runner-up in the 2013 and 2015 Tours, Quintana, had won three stage races in the lead up to the Tour, the Volta a Catalunya, the Tour de Romandie, and the Route du Sud. Contador, winner of the 2007 and 2009 Tours, found success in stage races during the season, winning the Tour of the Basque Country and placing second at Paris–Nice and the Volta a Catalunya.

The sprinters considered favourites for the points classification and wins on the flat or hilly bunch sprint finishes were Peter Sagan, Marcel Kittel, André Greipel, Mark Cavendish, Alexander Kristoff, John Degenkolb and Michael Matthews. Sagan, the world road race champion and winner of the points classification in the four previous Tours, had won the one-day classics, Gent–Wevelgem and the Tour of Flanders, and two stages of the Tour of California during the season before the Tour. Kittel's 2016 season had been successful up to the Tour as he had amassed a total of nine wins from sprints, most notably, two stages of the Giro and the Scheldeprijs one-day race. He also won both the general and points classifications of the Dubai Tour. Greipel's season total of wins so far was eight, with three Giro stages. Cavendish's form was not clear as his season was mostly spent training for the omnium track event at the Olympic Games the month following the Tour. Although Kristoff's total of wins in the season was eight, they were not in major races. Degenkolb had spent the majority of his season recovering from an injury and it was thought he could pose a threat. Matthews only had two wins so far in the season, both at Paris–Nice, including the race's points classification.

Route and stages

On 24 November 2014, ASO announced that for time the first time in Tour history the department of Manche would host the 2016 edition's opening stages (known as the Grand Départ), before further details of the first three stages held in Manche were released  on 9 December 2014. On 15 January 2015, the organisers confirmed that the race would visit Andorra, for the fifth time in history; after the 1964, 1993, 1997 and 2009 editions. The principality hosted the finish of the ninth stage, the first rest day and start of stage ten. The entire route was unveiled by race director Christian Prudhomme on 20 October 2015 at the Palais des Congrès in Paris. The defending champion Chris Froome said after the route was announced that he expected the course to suit him better than the previous year's course. "I think it's going to take a complete cyclist – but the stage that certainly stands out for me is Mont Ventoux", he added.

The first stage started at the Mont Saint-Michel island monastery and finished north on at Utah Beach. The second stage was held between Saint-Lô and Cherbourg-en-Cotentin. The third stage left Manche in Granville and headed south to the finish in Angers. Stage four took the race further south, between Saumur and Limoges, with the fifth stage crossing the elevated region of Massif Central to the finish at the Le Lioran mountain resort. Stage six headed to Montauban before the entrance to the Pyrenees in stage seven. This mountain range also hosted two further stages: a roller-coaster stage eight and the finish in Andorra in stage nine. The following three stages, 10 to 12, crossed the south of the country eastwards to Mont Ventoux. After an individual time trial, stage 14 took the race northwards through the Rhône Valley, which was followed by a stage that took the race into the Jura Mountains. Stage 16 ended with a finish in Bern, Switzerland. The next four stages took place in and around the Alps, before a long transfer took the Tour to the finish with the Champs-Élysées stage in Paris.

The highest point of elevation in the race was the -high Port d'Envalira mountain pass on stage ten. There were seven hors catégorie (English: beyond category) rated climbs in the race. There were sixteen new stage start or finish locations. The second rest day took place in Bern after stage 15.

Race overview

Grand Départ and journey south

The first stage's bunch sprint finish was won by Mark Cavendish, who gained the race leader's yellow jersey; he also claimed the green jersey as the leader of the points classification, with Paul Voss taking the polka dot jersey as the leader of the mountains classification. Alberto Contador crashed and lost 55 seconds. Peter Sagan took victory in stage two with an uphill sprint in Cherbourg, putting him in the yellow and green jerseys. Jasper Stuyven of  led the mountains classification. General classification rivals Contador and Richie Porte both lost time. The bunch sprint in Angers was won by Cavendish in a photo finish with André Greipel. Cavendish's win was his 28th in the Tour and drew him level with Bernard Hinault at second on the all-time list; Cavendish also took the green jersey. Another photo finish followed in the next stage with Marcel Kittel beating 's Bryan Coquard. Sagan claimed back the green and Thomas De Gendt the polka dot. Greg Van Avermaet of  won the fifth stage after he was the only rider to survive from an early breakaway. He took the lead of the general classification by over five minutes. Stage six was won by Cavendish, who beat Kittel and claimed the green jersey.

Pyrenees and transition
In stage seven, the first in the Pyrenees, Steve Cummings soloed over the final climb, the Col d'Aspin, and descended into the finish at Lac de Payolle where he took victory. Van Avermaet came fifth and extended his lead. 's Adam Yates attacked the chasing group and as he passed underneath the one kilometer to go arch it collapsed on top of, and injured, him. In the following stage Chris Froome attacked the front of the race of overall favourites as they passed the summit of the Col de Peyresourde, descending to the finish in Bagnères-de-Luchon to take a solo victory by thirteen seconds. This put him in the yellow jersey, sixteen seconds ahead of Yates in second, with Rafał Majka taking the polka dot. In the Tour's queen stage, the ninth, Tom Dumoulin of  broke clear of the large breakaway to claim the win at the Andorra-Arcalis. Thibaut Pinot took the lead of the mountains classification. Contador abandoned the race, citing a fever which had developed overnight. The next day was the first rest day of the Tour. Another breakaway succeeded in stage ten, with  using their advantage of having three riders in the small group to give Michael Matthews the win. Sagan, who came second, took the lead in the points classification.

On stage eleven, Sagan forced a move in the final  with his teammate Maciej Bodnar, who were followed by Froome and his teammate Geraint Thomas. They opened up a lead of over twenty seconds and held it to six seconds at the finish, where Sagan beat Froome in a sprint. A successful breakaway saw De Gendt win stage twelve at the finish at Chalet Reynard, which was changed from the intended summit finish at Mont Ventoux,  later, due to dangerous winds. In the chasing group of overall favourites, a leading group of Porte, Froome and Bauke Mollema crashed into the back of a camera motorbike that was stopped by the encroaching spectators. Froome's bike was unrideable and he was forced to run until he was given a bike from a neutral service car; although it did not fit him he managed to ride until he received his team bike. The race jury gave Froome and Porte the same time as Mollema, who later criticised the jury's decision, suggesting that they would have acted differently if he was the one to go down. De Gendt took the lead of the mountains classification. Stage thirteen's  individual time trial was won by Dumoulin, 1:03 ahead of Froome, who extended his lead over his nearest rival (Mollema) to one minute and forty-seven seconds. Cavendish won his fourth stage the next day with a bunch sprint at the Parc des Oiseaux.

Alps and finale
 rider Jarlinson Pantano won stage fifteen after a sprint with fellow surviving breakaway rider Majka. In next stage, Sagan won his third stage from a select group of sprinters that had traversed a cobbled climb  from the finish in Bern. The next day was the second rest day. In stage seventeen, as the race entered the Alps, 's Ilnur Zakarin attacked a breakaway and held off a chasing Pantano to take the win at the summit finish by the Émosson Dam. In the following stage's  mountain time trial Froome beat second-placed Dumoulin by 21 seconds and extended his lead to three minutes and 52 seconds overall, with Mollema keeping second. In stage nineteen, the general classification leaders descended the wet roads of the unclassified penultimate climb at the head of the race, with only Costa surviving from the breakaway. Romain Bardet attacked after a series of crashes that included Froome and Mollema. Froome took Thomas's bike and got back to the group, but Mollema was left isolated and finished over four minutes behind the stage winner Bardet, who had passed Costa in the final  and soloed to the finish at the Le Bettex ski station. Froome's lead was increased to 4' 11", with Bardet moving up from fifth to second. In stage twenty Jon Izaguirre took the win in Morzine, attacking on the wet descent from a three rider group that led over the final climb of Col de Joux Plane.

The final stage in Paris was won by Greipel, his second consecutive Champs-Élysées stage win. Froome finished the race to claim his third Tour de France, becoming the first man since Miguel Induráin in 1995 Tour to officially defend his title. He beat second-placed Bardet by four minutes and five seconds, with Nairo Quintana third, a further sixteen seconds down. Sagan won the points classification with a total of 470, 242 ahead of Greipel in second. Majka won the mountains classification with De Gendt and Pantano second and third respectively. The best young rider was Yates, two minutes and sixteen seconds ahead of second-placed Louis Meintjes.  finished as the winners of the team classification, over eight minutes ahead of second-placed . Of the 198 starters, 174 reached the finish of the last stage in Paris, beating the previous record high of 170 set in the 2010 Tour.

Classification leadership and minor prizes

There were four main individual classifications contested in the 2016 Tour de France, as well as a team competition. The most important was the general classification, which was calculated by adding each rider's finishing times on each stage. Time bonuses (time subtracted) were awarded at the end of every stage apart from the two individual time trials. The first three riders got 10, 6 and 4 seconds, respectively. If a crash had happened within the final  of a stage, not including time trials and summit finishes, the riders involved would have received the same time as the group they were in when the crash occurred. The rider with the lowest cumulative time was the winner of the general classification and was considered the overall winner of the Tour. The rider leading the classification wore a yellow jersey.

The second classification was the points classification. Riders received points for finishing among the highest placed in a stage finish, or in intermediate sprints during the stage. The points available for each stage finish were determined by the stage's type. The leader was identified by a green jersey.

The third classification was the mountains classification. Points were awarded to the riders that reached the summit of the most difficult climbs first. The climbs were categorised as fourth-, third-, second- or first-category and hors catégorie, with the more difficult climbs rated lower. Double points were awarded on the summit finishes on stages 9, 12, 17 and 19. The leader wore a white jersey with red polka dots.

The final individual classification was the young rider classification. This was calculated the same way as the general classification, but the classification was restricted to riders who were born on or after 1 January 1991. The leader wore a white jersey.

The final classification was a team classification. This was calculated using the finishing times of the best three riders per team on each stage; the leading team was the team with the lowest cumulative time. The number of stage victories and placings per team determined the outcome of a tie. The riders in the team that lead this classification were identified with yellow number bibs on the back of their jerseys and yellow helmets.

In addition, there was a combativity award given after each stage to the rider considered, by a jury, to have "made the greatest effort and who demonstrated the best qualities of sportsmanship". No combativity awards were given for the time trials and the final stage. The winner wore a red number bib the following stage. At the conclusion of the Tour, Peter Sagan won the overall super-combativity award, again, decided by a jury.

A total of €2,295,850 was awarded in cash prizes in the race. The overall winner of the general classification received €500,000, with the second and third placed riders getting €200,000 and €100,000 respectively. All finishers of the race were awarded with money. The holders of the classifications benefited on each stage they led; the final winners of the points and mountains were given €25,000, while the best young rider and most combative rider got €20,000. The team classification winners were given €50,000. €11,000 was given to the winners of each stage of the race, with smaller amounts given to places 2–20. There were also three special awards each with a prize of €5000. The Souvenir Jacques Goddet, given to the first rider to pass Goddet's memorial at the summit of the Col du Tourmalet on stage eight, the Souvenir Henri Desgrange, given to first rider to pass the summit of the highest climb in the Tour, the Port d'Envalira on stage ten, and the Prix Bernard Hinault, given to the rider with fastest ascent of the Côte de Domancy on stage eighteen. Thibaut Pinot won the Jacques Goddet, Rui Costa won the Henri Desgrange and Richie Porte won the Bernard Hinault.

 In stage two, Marcel Kittel, who was second in the points classification, wore the green jersey, because first placed Mark Cavendish wore the yellow jersey as leader of the general classification.
 In stages three and five, Mark Cavendish, who was second in the points classification, wore the green jersey, because first placed Peter Sagan wore the yellow jersey as leader of the general classification.

Final standings

General classification

Points classification

Mountains classification

Young rider classification

Team classification

UCI rankings

Riders from the WorldTeams competing individually, as well as for their teams and nations, for points that contributed towards the World Tour rankings. Riders from both the WorldTeams and Professional Continental teams also competed individually and for their nations for points that contributed towards the new UCI World Ranking, which included all UCI road races. Points were awarded to the top twenty (World Tour) and sixty finishers (World Ranking) in the general classification and to the top five finishers in each stage. The points accrued by Chris Froome moved him up to third in the World Tour and second in the World Ranking. Peter Sagan held the lead of both rankings. 's strong showing put them in the lead of the World Tour team ranking, replacing . Spain and France remained the leaders of the WorldTour and World Ranking nation rankings, respectively.

See also

 2016 in men's road cycling
 2016 in sports
 2016 La Course by Le Tour de France

Notes

References

Bibliography

External links

 

 
2016 in French sport
2016 UCI World Tour
July 2016 sports events in France
2016